Dinwoodie railway station was a station which served the rural area around the settlement of Dinwoodie, 6 miles north of Lockerbie in Applegarth parish, Scottish county of Dumfries and Galloway. It was served by local trains on what is now known as the West Coast Main Line. The nearest station for Dinwoodie is now at Lockerbie.

History 
Opened by the Caledonian Railway on 10 September 1847, or 15 February 1848 is another suggested opening date for the station.
It became part of the London Midland and Scottish Railway during the Grouping of 1923 and was then closed by British Railways in 1960.

Dinwoodie derailment
On 25 October 1928 an accident took place in LMS days near Dinwoodie due to signaller error and fatigue which resulted in a collision from the rear involving two trains. A derailment occurred and the train fell some height from the embankment. Four people were killed and five injured. The two drivers and two firemen died instantly when their double-headed passenger express, the Royal Highlander, collided with a broken down freight train and their memorial is in Stanwix cemetery.

The site today 
Trains pass at speed on the electrified West Coast Main Line. The stationmaster's house is now a private dwelling and the platforms have been demolished; the station cottages also survive as private dwellings. A signal box controlled the level crossing on the minor road which has now been closed and an overbridge built nearby.

References

Notes

Sources

External links
 Station photograph
 Derailment photograph

Disused railway stations in Dumfries and Galloway
Railway stations in Great Britain opened in 1847
Railway stations in Great Britain closed in 1960
Former Caledonian Railway stations
1847 establishments in Scotland
1960 disestablishments in Scotland